The Atrocity Exhibition... Exhibit A is the eighth studio album by American thrash metal band Exodus, released on October 26, 2007. It is the second album to feature Rob Dukes on vocals and Lee Altus on guitars, and it also marks the second comeback of longtime original Exodus drummer Tom Hunting. Hunting's last appearance was on the 2004 album Tempo of the Damned.

Title 
The album takes its name from an experimental novel of the same name by J. G. Ballard published in 1970. The name of the album is the same as a planned album that was to be released by the Los Angeles thrash metal outfit Dark Angel in 1992. Guitarist Gary Holt has stated it is named "Exhibit A" because Exodus had planned to release a follow-up Exhibit B album soon afterward, although that album was not released until 2010.

Release and reception 
On October 17, 2007, the entire album was uploaded on the band's MySpace page; however, many of the people that pre-ordered the album from CM Distro received it on October 19. The single released from the album was "Funeral Hymn". There was also a music video released for "Riot Act". The song "Riot Act" was released as DLC for the video game Rock Band 2 via the Rock Band Network on June 6, 2010.

The Atrocity Exhibition... Exhibit A was well received by the metal press. In addition, it won the 2007 Metal Storm Award for Best Thrash Metal Album.

Exhibit A sold 3,600 copies in its first week of release in the U.S., and as of November 2008 had sold 22,000 copies in the U.S.

Track listing 
All songs written by Gary Holt, except where noted.

Notes 
The song "Bedlam 1-2-3" ends at 7:57, from minute 7:02 to 7:57 there is an outro which is also used as the intro of the following album's lead-off track "The Ballad of Leonard and Charles"; followed by 10 mins. 10 secs. of total silence. At 18:08, an extremely country-influenced version of the band's classic song "Bonded by Blood" begins. Due to the extremely country sound of the song, it was nicknamed "Bonded by Banjo" and is also sometimes referred to as "Banjoed by Blood." The country-influenced version of "Bonded by Blood" also plays during the credits of the band's Wacken 2008 performance on the Shovel Headed Tour Machine: Live at Wacken & Other Assorted Atrocities live DVD.

The song ends with a "Yeehaw!" heard in the background followed by an untitled 6 second hidden track in which the listener can hear someone screaming "That was some heavy shit!". The exact breakdown of the 19:51 track is as follows:

 "Bedlam 1-2-3":  0:00 – 7:57
 Silence:  7:58 – 18:07
 "Bonded By Banjo":  18:08 – 19:51

Personnel 
 Rob Dukes – vocals
 Gary Holt – guitars
 Lee Altus – guitars
 Jack Gibson – bass
 Tom Hunting – drums

Charts

References 

Exodus (American band) albums
2007 albums
Nuclear Blast albums
Albums produced by Andy Sneap